In motorsport, a privateer is usually an entrant into a racing event that is not directly supported by an automobile or motorcycle manufacturer. Privateers teams are often found competing in rally, circuit racing and motorcycle racing events and often include competitors who build and maintain their own vehicles and motorcycles. In previous Formula One seasons, privately owned teams would race using the chassis of another team or constructor in preference to building their own car; the Concorde Agreement now prohibits this practice. Increasingly the term is being used in an F1 context to refer to teams who are not at least part-owned by large corporations, such as Williams F1 and McLaren F1 Team.

Many privateer entrants compete for the enjoyment of the sport, and are not paid to be racing drivers.

See also
Contrast: Factory-backed

Motorsport terminology